Stephen John Walker (born 11 October 2000) is an English professional footballer who is currently a free agent. He last played for Championship club Middlesbrough.

Club career

Middlesbrough
Walker signed his first professional contract with the club on 1 July 2016. He made his debut for the club on 14 August 2018, assisting an Ashley Fletcher goal and scoring a penalty in the penalty shoot-out during an EFL Cup tie with Notts County at the Riverside Stadium. On 30 January 2019, Walker signed a new four and a half year contract with Middlesbrough.

The following day, Walker was loaned to League Two club Milton Keynes Dons until the end of the season. Exactly one year later, on 31 January 2020, he joined League Two side Crewe Alexandra on loan until the end of the season, making his debut at Gresty Road against Oldham Athletic on 8 February 2020. He scored his first professional goal, for Crewe in a 2-0 win over Macclesfield Town at Gresty Road, on 22 February 2020.

On 16 October 2020, Stephen Walker signed a season-long loan deal with MK Dons, returning to stadium mk for a second spell with the Buckinghamshire outfit. After appearing in twelve league games for the Dons, Walker was recalled by Middlesbrough on 13 January 2021.

On 22 January 2021, Walker was then loaned again to Crewe until the end of the 2020-21 season. He scored the first goal of his new loan spell, equalising in a 1-1 draw at Blackpool on 2 March 2021.

On 31 August 2021, Walker joined League Two side Tranmere Rovers on a season-long loan deal.

In January 2023, Walker was removed from Middlesbrough's player list on their website and it therefore appears he has left the club.

International career
Walker has represented England at U17, U18 and U19 level. In March 2018, Walker scored twice for England's under-18s against Qatar.

In October 2018, Walker scored a hat-trick for the under-19s against Macedonia. He then scored the winner in a qualifier against Iceland U19.

Career statistics

References

External links

2000 births
Living people
Footballers from Middlesbrough
English footballers
England youth international footballers
Association football forwards
Middlesbrough F.C. players
Milton Keynes Dons F.C. players
Crewe Alexandra F.C. players
Tranmere Rovers F.C. players
English Football League players